Mazar-Suu is a village in Jalal-Abad Region of Kyrgyzstan. It is part of the Toktogul District. Its population was 1,968 in 2021.

References
 

Populated places in Jalal-Abad Region